Miclești is a commune in Criuleni District, Moldova. It is composed of two villages, Miclești and Stețcani.

References

Communes of Criuleni District